Humboldtiana is a genus of American air-breathing land snails, terrestrial pulmonate gastropod mollusks in the subfamily Humboldtianinae.

Anatomy

Snails in this genus create and use love darts as part of their mating behavior.

The scanning electron microscope images on the left show (above) the lateral view of the love dart of Humboldtiana nuevoleonis, scale bar 500 μm (0.5 mm); and (below) a cross section of the dart, scale bar 50 μm.

Species
Species within the genus Humboldtiana include:
 Humboldtiana agavophila Pratt, 1971
 Humboldtiana hoegiana
 Humboldtiana nuevoleonis Pilsbry, 1927
 Humboldtiana ultima

References

Further reading 
 
 Pilsbry H. A. (1948). "Inland Mollusks of Northern Mexico. I. The genera Humboldtiana, Sonorella, Oreohelix and Ashmunella". Proceedings of the Academy of Natural Sciences of Philadelphia 100: 185-203.
 A list of papers about the Humboldtiana

Xanthonychidae
Taxa named by Hermann von Ihering